This is a list of schools with these initials. Not all are known by their initials

Australia
Camberwell Grammar School in Melbourne, Australia
Canberra Grammar School in Canberra, Australia
Caulfield Grammar School in Melbourne, Australia

Bangladesh
Chittagong Government High School
Chittagong Grammar School

United Kingdom
Caistor Grammar School in Caistor, England
Carre's Grammar School in Sleaford, England
Carrickfergus Grammar School in Carrickfergus, Northern Ireland
Colyton Grammar School in Devon, England

United States
Catlin Gabel School in Portland, Oregon
Commonwealth Governor's School serving Stafford, King George, and Spotsylvania counties, Virginia, US
Boston University College of General Studies

Elsewhere
Calgary Girls' School, Alberta, Canada
Crescent Girls' School in Singapore

Lists of schools